The Dos Valires Tunnel (Tunel de Dos Valires) is a major road tunnel in Andorra linking the two upper Andorran parishes of La Massana and Encamp. The tunnel connects Generals Roads 2 and 3 linking the Valira del Nord (North Valley) and the Valira d'Orient (East Valley). It is the first stage of the northern bypass of Andorra la Vella/Escaldes-Engordany.

History
The construction of the tunnel was started in 2005 but was halted in 2009 after one of the viaducts at the La Massana entrance collapsed and killed 5 Portuguese construction workers. The tunnel cost over €160 million to build and it is estimated that 2500 vehicles per day will use the tunnel.

References

Tunnels in Andorra
La Massana
Encamp
Road tunnels